Diuris eburnea is a species of orchid that is endemic to the south-west of Western Australia. It has between four and six linear leaves and up to eight pale yellow to cream-coloured flowers with reddish markings. It is only known from near the Arrowsmith River north of Eneabba.

Description
Flowering occurs in October and November.

Taxonomy and naming
Diuris eburnea was first formally described in 2006 by David Jones from a specimen collected north of Eneabba and the description was published in Australian Orchid Research. The specific epithet (eburnea) is a Latin word meaning "of ivory", referring to the colour of the flowers of this orchid.

Distribution and habitat
The Arrowsmith bee orchid grows in winter-wet areas on the banks of the Arrowsmith River in the Geraldton Sandplains biogeographic region.

Conservation
Diuris eburnea is classified as "Priority One" by the Western Australian Government Department of Parks and Wildlife, meaning that it is known from only one or a few locations which are potentially at risk.

References

eburnea
Endemic orchids of Australia
Orchids of Western Australia
Plants described in 2006